Taraka, usually derived from Sanskrit tāraka ("crossing; ferryman; star; eye"), may refer to:

Hinduism 
 Taraka mantra, various mantras spoken by Hindus at their deaths
 Tārakāsura, an asura defeated by Skanda
 Taraka (goddess), wife of god Brihaspati
 Tataka, a yaksha-turned-demoness

People 
 N. T. Rama Rao (Taraka Rama Rao Nandamuri, 1923-1996), Indian Telugu film veteran actor and politician
 N. T. Rama Rao Jr. (Taraka Rama Rao Nandamuri, Jr.), Indian Telugu film actor; grandson of N. T. Rama Rao
 Taraka Ratna (Taraka Ratna Nandamuri), Indian Telugu film actor; grandson of N. T. Rama Rao

Other uses 
 Taraka, Lanao del Sur, a municipality in the Philippines.
 Taraka, Papua New Guinea, a suburb of Lae in the Morobe Province, Papua New Guinea
 Taraka (butterfly), a genus of butterflies

See also
 Tarak (disambiguation), the Hindi form of the Sanskrit name Taraka